The following highways are numbered 17A:

Canada

 Ontario Highway 17A
 Prince Edward Island Route 17A

India
  National Highway 17A (India)

United States
 Connecticut Route 17A
 County Road 17A (Polk County, Florida)
 New York State Route 17A
 New York State Route 17A (1920s–1930) (former)
 Oklahoma State Highway 17A
 Secondary State Highway 17A (Washington) (former)